Olivarez, Olívarez or Olivárez is a Spanish-language surname. Notable people with the surname include:

 Edwin Olivarez (1963), Filipino politician, athlete, and businessman
 Graciela Olivarez (1928–1987), American civil rights lawyer
 Helcris Olivarez (1967),  Dominican professional baseball pitcher
 José Olivarez, American poet of Mexican descent
 Sebastián Olivarez (1992), Argentine professional footballer
 Vanessa Olivarez (1981), American singer, songwriter and actress

Other
 Olivarez, Texas, a census-designated place
 Olivarez College, in the Philippines

See also
 Olivares (disambiguation)

Spanish-language surnames
Spanish toponymic surnames